Tje is a letter of the Cyrillic script. It comes from a ligature of Te (Т т) and soft sign (Ь ь). The letter has been used in the Surgut and Shurishkar dialects of the Khanty language since 2013, where it represents the palatalized voiceless alveolar plosive , somewhat like the pronunciation of the t in "team".

Computing codes

Being a relatively recent letter, Tje is not yet in Unicode. It will be added in a future version of Unicode, at code points U+1C89 for capital Tje, and U+1C8A for lowercase Tje.

Related letters and other similar characters

Љ љ - Cyrillic letter Lje
Њ њ - Cyrillic letter Nje
Ԏ ԏ - Cyrillic letter Komi Tje
Ћ ћ - Cyrillic letter Tshe

References

Cyrillic ligatures
Unencoded Cyrillic letters